Heinrich Schmidt (25 September 1904 – 29 November 1988) was an Austrian composer. His work was part of the music event in the art competition at the 1936 Summer Olympics.

References

1904 births
1988 deaths
Austrian male composers
Olympic competitors in art competitions
People from Wiener Neustadt-Land District
20th-century male musicians